John Coghlan may refer to:

 John Coghlan (cricketer) (1867–1945), South African cricketer
 John Coghlan (drummer) (born 1946), drummer for the band Status Quo
 John Coghlan (engineer) (1824–1890), Irish-born engineer in Argentina
 John Coghlan (footballer) (born 1956), Australian footballer for South Melbourne
 John Coghlan (hurler) (born 1989), Irish hurler 
 John M. Coghlan (1835–1879), U.S. Representative from California
 Johnny Coghlan (1876–1916), Australian footballer for Melbourne